Les Chants Magnétiques (English title: Magnetic Fields) is the fifth studio album by French electronic musician and composer Jean-Michel Jarre, released on Disques Dreyfus on 20 May 1981. The album reached number six in the United Kingdom, number 98 in the United States and number 76 in Australia.

Title 

The title of the album is a play on words in the French language. The literal English translation of the French title, "Les Chants Magnétiques", is "Magnetic Songs". However, the French word for 'fields' (champs) is a homophone of the French word for 'songs' (chants) - so in French, if the title is spoken out loud, it can be interpreted as either magnetic fields or as magnetic songs, and it is only when written down that the ambiguity is resolved.

The English title, "Magnetic Fields" is a literal translation of "les champs magnétiques" rather than "les chants magnétiques", and the pun in the original French title is lost in translation.

Composition and recording 
The album is one of the first to use sounds from the Fairlight CMI. Its digital technology allowed Jarre to continue his earlier sonic experimentation in new ways. He also used instruments from the EMS company, among them the Synthi AKS, the VCS 3 and the Vocoder 1000.

"Les Chants Magnétiques (Part 1)" is divided into three different movements, "kicking off with an exhibitionist, cocksure first movement that seems to keep reaching to the sky for yet more key changes, followed by the swishy human samples and surreality of the second, and the mechanical chuntering and sonic lack of constraint of the third". 

In minimalist piece "Les Chants Magnétiques (Part 3)" employs sounds from a toy box, and Jarre's collaborator Michel Geiss recorded the sounds produced by trains that would be used in the album. Les Chants Magnétiques was recorded and mixed by Jean-Pierre Janiaud assisted by Patrick Foulon at Croissy studio, the cover was designed by Remy Magron.

Release 
Les Chants Magnétiques was released on 20 May 1981 in Europe and on 15 June 1981 in the USA. It sold a reported 200,000 units in France alone by the beginning of July. In that same year, the British Embassy gave Radio Beijing copies of his albums, which became the first pieces of foreign music to be played on Chinese national radio in decades. China invited Jarre to become the first western musician to play there since the death of Mao Zedong.

Critical reception 

Contemporary reception of the album was generally positive. Cashbox wrote that Magnetic Fields "is Jarre's most subtle work yet, being a bit busier than Oxygene and more textural than Equinoxe". In Smash Hits, Johnny Black stated that the album "proves more energetic than either of its two mega-selling predecessors. It is, arguably, wallpaper music, but his creative use of Latin and African rhythms ... moves it all up a notch." 

Simon Tebbutt of Record Mirror described the album as "nullifying, stultifying and ultimately BORING". In an AllMusic retrospective review, writer John Bush commented that: "It's often just as melodic and inventive as Oxygene, though not as consistently creative."

Track listing

Charts

Weekly charts

Year-end charts

Certifications and sales

References

Bibliography 
 

1981 albums
Jean-Michel Jarre albums
Electronic albums by French artists
Synth-pop albums by French artists